The Amazing Nina Simone is a studio album by Nina Simone, released in July 1959. It was her second album, and her first recording for Colpix Records. The album contains a variety of material, including jazz, gospel, and folk songs. Compared to her debut, which showcased Simone's piano playing ability in addition to her singing, the piano was downplayed on Amazing in favor of string arrangements.

Overview

Recording 
Simone's first album Little Girl Blue had been released by Bethlehem Records in February 1959. However, the tracks for that album had been recorded way back in late 1957, and Simone was dissatisfied by the time it took for Bethlehem to release the album as well as the lack of effort the record company took in promoting her. Soon after Little Girl Blue was released she was talking to Colpix Records about a new contract. As Nadine Cohodas puts it in Princess Noire: The Tumultuous Reign of Nina Simone (2010): 'Unbeknownst to Nina, discussions about her career were going forward on two fronts'. On the one hand, at Bethlehem, Simone's contract was approaching it's option. New owner Syd Nathan, who ran King Records and who had recently bailed out the ailing Bethlehem, did not want to renew. 'We don’t need the broad' he told Gus Wildi, Bethlehem’s founder. On the other hand, Joyce Selznick (niece of the producer David O. Selznick and East Coast talent scout for Columbia Pictures) wanted Simone at Colpix - Columbia's record division. Selznick arranged an audition, and Simone was signed immediately.

The album was recorded in April 1959, and - according to Cohodas - 14 tracks were cut.

Release 
The album was released in July 1959. In a review dated 25 July 1959 in Cash Box, the premier American music industry trade magazine of the time, the reviewer wrote: 'Emerging as one of the bright new singing talents of the year, Nina Simone makes her Colpix LP debut [...] Her deep-toned expressive voice and exquisite phrasing are a listening delight. Outstanding album.' The album featured 12 tracks.

The Amazing Nina Simone Track list

Personnel
Nina Simone – vocals, piano
Bob Mersey – arrangement, conductor

Contemporary Singles from the album

This is a list of contemporary singles with tracks from The Amazing Nina Simone  as an A Side.

Between 1959 and 1963, Colpix issued 14 Nina Simone singles. The first two are listed above, with A Sides from The Amazing Nina Simone. A number of subsequent singles which had A Sides taken from later albums or were non-album tracks would feature some cuts from The Amazing Nina Simone as B Sides. These are her third, fifth, eleventh, and twelfth Colpix singles.

Reissues
The Amazing Nina Simone was reissued in 2005 with the same track listing but with four additional songs ('I Loves You Porgy', 'Falling In Love Again (I Can't Help It)', 'That's All', and 'The Man With A Horn'). All these songs were originally issued on Nina Simone with Strings (1966).

References

1959 albums
Nina Simone albums
Colpix Records albums
Albums recorded at Van Gelder Studio